Board of Trade may refer to:

 Chamber of commerce

Argentina
Rosario Board of Trade, a non-profit association based in Rosario, in the Province of Santa Fe

Canada
Brampton Board of Trade, a business organization first founded in Brampton, Ontario in 1887
Burnaby Board of Trade Directory, a magazine-style resource for people who are involved in the business community in Burnaby, British Columbia
Old Toronto Board of Trade Building, the first skyscraper in Toronto at seven stories
Toronto Board of Trade, the largest local chamber of commerce in Canada
Vancouver Board of Trade, a not-for-profit association with the goal of developing Vancouver as a Pacific centre for trade, commerce and travel

Sweden
Swedish National Board of Trade, a Swedish government agency that answers to the Ministry for Foreign Affairs

United Kingdom
Board of Trade, a committee of the Privy Council
Parliamentary Secretary to the Board of Trade, a member of Parliament assigned to assist the Board of Trade and its President
Vice-President of the Board of Trade, a junior ministerial position in the government of the United Kingdom
Secretary of State for Business, Enterprise and Regulatory Reform, a cabinet position with the secondary title of President of the Board of Trade

United States
California Chamber of Commerce, which traces its roots directly to the California State Board of Trade
Board of Trade of City of Chicago v. Olsen, a decision by the Supreme Court of the United States
Chicago Board of Trade, the world's oldest futures and options exchange
Chicago Board of Trade Building, a skyscraper located in Chicago, Illinois
Chicago Board of Trade Independent Battery Light Artillery, an artillery battery that served in the Union Army during the American Civil War
Greater Washington Board of Trade, a network of business and non-profit leaders in Washington, D.C.
Kansas City Board of Trade, a commodity futures and options exchange regulated by the Commodity Futures Trading Commission
New York Board of Trade, a physical commodity futures exchange
Zion's Central Board of Trade, a church-founded organization to foster economic growth and cooperation in 19th Century Utah Territory.